Vladimir Petrovich Danilevich (4 September 1924 – 9 October 2001) was a well-known Soviet and Russian animator who successfully worked as a film director, screenwriter and art director.

Selected filmography

Director
1976—"How an Old Man destroyed The Great Balance"
1989—"The Newcomer in The Cabbage" 
1990—"Vaniusha The Newcomer"
1991—"Vaniusha and The Space Pirate"
1993—"Vaniusha and The Giant"
1993—"An Autumn Meeting"
1993—"Caveman and Friends: Surprise Caveman"

Screenwriter
1993—"An Autumn Meeting"

Art Director
1956—"A Wonderfull Well" 
1958—"Beloved Beauty"
1959—"The Soldier has returned home"

Animator
1949—"Geese-Swans" 
1949—"Mister Wolf"
1952—"The Snow Maiden"
1956—"A Wonderfull Well"

Second Director (First Assistant)
1964—Lefty 
1966—Go There, Don't Know Where

(Full Filmography of Vladimir Danilevich)

References

External links
 

Russian animators
Russian animated film directors
Soviet animators
1924 births
2001 deaths
Soviet animation directors